ǂHaba (ǂHabá) is a variety of the Khoe languages spoken in Botswana. Traditionally included in the Gǁana dialect cluster, it appears to be closer to Naro. It is endangered, with most ǂHaba speaking Naro.

Phonology
ǂHaba has the click inventory of Naro, with the glottalized series that not all Naro dialects have. There are seven tones in (bimoraic) roots with a nasal onset (high and mid level, high and low falling, mid–low, low–mid, and low–high), six tones with a voiceless onset, and four tones elsewhere (voiced but not nasal).

References

Bibliography
Hirosi Nakagawa (2011) 'ǂHaba Tonology'. 4th International Symposium on Khoisan Languages and Linguistics, Riezlern.

External links
ǂHaba basic lexicon at the Global Lexicostatistical Database

Click languages
Khoe languages
Languages of Botswana